The 2010–11 Carolina Hurricanes season was the 32nd season for the National Hockey League franchise that was established on June 22, 1979, and 13th season since the franchise relocated to North Carolina to start the 1997–98 NHL season.

The Hurricanes posted a regular season record of 40 wins, 31 losses and 11 overtime/shootout losses for 91 points, failing to qualify for the Stanley Cup playoffs for the second consecutive season.

Off-Season 
On June 17, the Carolina Hurricanes announced that they will play seven games during the pre-season – six against NHL teams and one against SKA St. Petersburg of the Kontinental Hockey League (KHL).

For their first-round selection, the Hurricanes selected Jeff Skinner at the 2010 NHL Entry Draft. The Hurricanes had eight selections in total at the Draft.

Regular season 

The Carolina Hurricanes started their 2010–11 season (as well as the 2010–11 NHL season) with a two-game series in Helsinki, Finland, against the Minnesota Wild. The Hurricanes swept the Wild in the two-game series, with 18-year-old rookie Jeff Skinner scoring the sole shootout goal to win the second game for the Hurricanes.

After Helsinki, the Hurricanes embarked on a five-game, nine-day road trip starting in Ottawa and ending in Phoenix on October 23. The Hurricanes arrived in Raleigh with a 4–3–0 record before their home opener against the Washington Capitals.

Before the October 30 game against the Pittsburgh Penguins, General Manager Jim Rutherford announced that Jeff Skinner would stay with Carolina Hurricanes for the remainder of 2010–11 season.

On November 17, Rutherford announced that defenseman Anton Babchuk and right wing Tom Kostopoulos would be traded to the Calgary Flames for defenseman Ian White and center Brett Sutter in an effort to "stabilize" the Canes' defense following two lopsided losses to the Montreal Canadiens and the Philadelphia Flyers.

The Hurricanes claimed right wing Troy Bodie on waivers and traded for center Ryan Carter – both from the Anaheim Ducks – on November 16 and 23, respectively. Bodie and Carter, along with Jiri Tlusty, are expected to bring more physicality to the Hurricanes' fourth line.

The Hurricanes concluded the regular season with the most power-play opportunities in the NHL, with 346.

Standings

Divisional standings

Conference standings

Schedule and results

Pre-season

Regular season

Playoffs
The Hurricanes missed the playoffs for the second straight year by two points.

Player statistics

Skaters

†Denotes player spent time with another team before joining Hurricanes. Stats reflect time with Hurricanes only.
‡Traded mid-season
Bold/italics denotes franchise record

Goaltenders
Note: GP = Games played; Min = Minutes played; W = Wins; L = Losses; OT = Overtime losses; GA = Goals against; GAA= Goals against average; SA= Shots against; SV= Saves; Sv% = Save percentage; SO= Shutouts

†Denotes player spent time with another team before joining Hurricanes. Stats reflect time with Hurricanes only.
‡Traded mid-season
Bold/italics denotes franchise record

Awards and records

Awards

Records

Milestones

Transactions 

The Hurricanes have been involved in the following transactions during the 2010–11 season.

Trades

Notes

Free agents acquired

Free agents lost

Claimed via waivers

Lost via waivers

Lost via retirement

Player signings

Draft picks 
The 2010 NHL Entry Draft was held in Los Angeles • California.

Farm teams

American Hockey League 
The Charlotte Checkers are the Hurricanes' American Hockey League affiliate for the 2010–11 AHL season. The Checkers' ECHL franchise was folded and the Albany River Rats relocated to Charlotte as a replacement. The strategic partnership was designed to reduce travel costs and increase support for the organization across the state.

ECHL 
The Florida Everblades are the Hurricanes ECHL affiliate.

References

External links 
2010–11 Carolina Hurricanes season at ESPN
2010–11 Carolina Hurricanes season at Hockey Reference

 

Carolina Hurricanes seasons
C
C
National Hockey League All-Star Game hosts
Hurr
Hurr